Events from the year 1840 in France.

Incumbents
 Monarch – Louis Philippe I

Events
20 January - Dumont D'Urville discovers Adélie Land, Antarctica.
1 March - Adolphe Thiers becomes prime minister.
30 September - The frigate Belle Poule arrives in Cherbourg-en-Cotentin, returning the remains of Napoleon from Saint Helena. He is buried in Les Invalides.
Metric system again mandatory across France.

Arts and literature
11 February - Gaetano Donizetti's opera La Fille du Regiment premieres in Paris.

Births
2 April - Émile Zola, writer (died 1902)
22 April - Odilon Redon, painter and printmaker (died 1916)
13 May - Alphonse Daudet, novelist (died 1897)
20 October - Désiré-Magloire Bourneville, neurologist (died 1909)
12 November - Auguste Rodin, sculptor (died 1917)
14 November - Claude Monet, painter (died 1926)

Full date unknown
Louis-Émile Bertin, naval engineer (died 1924)

Deaths
13 February - Nicolas Joseph Maison, Marshal of France and Minister of War (born 1770)
27 February - John Tessier, French Sulpician priest (born 1758)
22 March - Étienne Bobillier, mathematician (born 1798)
25 April - Siméon Denis Poisson, mathematician and physicist (born 1781)
7 June - Népomucène Lemercier, poet and dramatist (born 1771)
20 June - Pierre-Joseph Redouté, painter and botanist (born 1759)
7 September - Étienne-Jacques-Joseph-Alexandre MacDonald, Marshal of France (born 1765)

References

1840s in France